Robella is a comune (municipality) in the Province of Asti in the Italian region Piedmont, located about  east of Turin and about  northwest of Asti.

The municipality of Robella contains the frazione (subdivision) Cortiglione.

Robella borders the following municipalities: Brozolo, Cocconato, Montiglio Monferrato, Murisengo, Odalengo Grande, and Verrua Savoia.

Demographic evolution

References

Cities and towns in Piedmont